Vidyasagar College for Women is a women's college affiliated to the University of Calcutta.

History
It was founded in 1960. However, its history goes back to 1931 when a separate women's section of the Vidyasagar College was started to cater to the educational requirements of the women folk of Kolkata. Since its foundation in 1960, Vidyasagar College for Women committed itself to carry forward the ideals and principles of Pundit Iswar Chandra Vidyasagar, the great educationist and social reformer of the 19th century.

About college
Vidyasagar College for Women is a morning college. The college offers a wide variety of both academic and job oriented professional courses. The main campus is located at 39, Sankar Ghosh Lane, Kolkata 6 and its upcoming annexe at 8A Shibnarayan Das Lane and at Vidyasagar Smriti Mandir, the residence of Pundit Iswar Chandra Vidyasagar at 36 Vidyasagar Street, Kolkata 700 009.

Library
The college has two libraries - (a) a central library located on the third campus at 8A, Shibnarayan Das Lane, with over 23,000 physical documents; and (b) a seminar library located on the main campus. With about 1000 reference volumes, the seminar library caters mainly to the Humanities department. The library is in the process of complete library automation. Originally based on SOUL software, it has started the transition to move to Koha ILS. The online public access catalog (OPAC) is available and can be accessed at https://vcfw-opac.l2c2.co.in/

See also 
List of colleges affiliated to the University of Calcutta
Education in India
Education in West Bengal
Vidyasagar College

References

External links
 Official web site

University of Calcutta affiliates
Universities and colleges in Kolkata
Women's universities and colleges in West Bengal
Educational institutions established in 1960
1960 establishments in West Bengal